The 2010–11 Wyoming Cowboys basketball team represented the University of Wyoming during the 2010–2011 NCAA Division I men's basketball season. The Cowboys was coached by Heath Schroyer, he was fired on February 8, 2011. Fred Langley replaced Heath Schroyer as their interim coach. They played their home games at the Arena-Auditorium in Laramie, Wyoming. The Cowboys are a member of the Mountain West Conference. They finished the season 10–21, 3–13 in Mountain West play and lost in the first round of the 2011 Mountain West Conference men's basketball tournament to TCU.

Preview 
The Cowboys were picked to finish eighth in the Mountain West Conference.

Roster

Statistics

Schedule and results

|-
!colspan=9 style=| Exhibition

|-
!colspan=9 style=| Regular Season

|-
!colspan=10 style=| Mountain West tournament

References

Wyoming Cowboys basketball seasons
Wyoming
Wyoming Cowboys bask
Wyoming Cowboys bask